El Cajon Mountain, commonly known as El Capitan or El cap, is a mountain in the Cuyamaca Mountains, and prominent natural landmark in the East County of San Diego.

Geography
The mountain is almost completely surrounded by private property and an Indian reservation, but the mountain itself is mostly within the Cleveland National Forest or the County of San Diego's El Capitan Open Space Preserve.

Recreation
There are two main routes to climb El Cajon Mountain, the main class 1 trail hike from Lakeside, California, and several class 3 climbs up the south face, which is now private property and closed to public access. The main trail hike is considered one of the hardest hikes in San Diego County because of its steep climbs and rolling terrain.

Gallery

See also 
 Cleveland National Forest

References 

Mountains of San Diego County, California
Cuyamaca Mountains
Cleveland National Forest
Mountains of Southern California